Daria Gleissner (born 30 June 1993), also rendered in German as Gleißner, is a German ice hockey player for the Memmingen Indians and the German national team.

She experienced an accident in training against the US team in Sotchi 5 February 2014 but made a full recovery. She participated at the 2015 IIHF Women's World Championship.

References

External links
 
 

1993 births
Living people
German women's ice hockey defencemen
People from Kaufbeuren
Sportspeople from Swabia (Bavaria)